Jean Beleth (-1182) was a twelfth-century French liturgist and theologian. He is thought to have been rector in a Paris theological college. That he was possibly of English origin was a hypothesis discussed by John Pits, and supported by Thomas Tanner; but is no longer taken seriously.

Life

Beleth is recorded at Tiron in 1135, studying at Chartres around that time, probably teaching theology in Paris, and recorded in 1182 at Amiens.

Works

His Summa de Ecclesiasticis Officiis is a manual and now a source for the Christian liturgy of his time; it was later printed (Rationale divinorum officiorum), and has been dated to 1162.

Jean Belet de Vigny
The 19th-century editions of the Encyclopædia Britannica claimed that Jean Belet de Vigny (fl. 14th century) edited many important works including the edition and translation into French of the  hagiography known as the Legenda Sanctorum (Golden Legend). Considering that one of the original authors of the hagiography most frequently named is one "Johannes Beleth", it is more likely that the 14th-century first French edition was a translation from a version of the Golden Legend written by Beleth.

References

Citations

Bibliography
 . 
 .
 .

External links

12th-century French writers
12th-century French Catholic theologians
12th-century births
12th-century deaths
French male writers
12th-century Latin writers